Chelsea Grin is the debut EP by American deathcore band Chelsea Grin. It was originally released as downloadable content through iTunes and later into Compact Disc format. It assisted in popularizing the band and is their only release through Statik Factory Records before switching to Artery Recordings the following year of its release. The songs "Cheyne Stokes" and "Recreant" were re-recorded for their debut full-length album, which was released in 2010. This is their only recording as 5 piece lineup before they switched to their signature 6 piece lineup by adding a third guitarist, which would last until 2018.

In January 2015, the EP was reissued as a signed digipak and was made available on their online store. The release was limited to only 1,000 copies.

Track listing

Personnel
Chelsea Grin
Alex Koehler - vocals
Chris Kilbourn - rhythm guitar
Mike Stafford - lead guitar
Austin Marticorena - bass guitar
Andrew Carlston - drums

Production
Produced by Stephan Hawkes
Recorded, Mixed & mastered by Matt Winegar 
Art by Dennis Sibeijn

References 

2008 debut EPs
Chelsea Grin EPs